Rickwood may refer to:

Chris Rickwood (b. 1973), an American composer
Dan Rickwood (b. ?), an English artist who uses the pseudonym Stanley Donwood
Frank Rickwood (1921-2009), Australian geologist and businessman.
Rickwood Caverns State Park, a state park in Warrior, Alabama, in the United States
The Rickwood Classic, an annual "throwback" game played by the Birmingham Barons baseball team in the United States
Rickwood Field, a baseball field in Birmingham, Alabama, in the United States
, a United States Navy patrol boat in commission from 1917 to 1919